Tihuana is a Brazilian rock band, formed in 1999 in São Paulo. Their musical influences include reggae, rap, rock, ska and Latin music. They have gained prominence outside Brazil recently due to their part in the soundtrack of Tropa de Elite.

Past members
 Egypcio: vocals and guitar
 Román: bass and backing vocals
 Léo: guitar
 PG: drums and backing vocals
Baía: percussion, vocals and backing vocals
Fouad: percussion

Discography

Studio albums 
(2000) Ilegal
 (2001) A Vida Nos Ensina
 (2002) Aqui ou em Qualquer Lugar
 (2004) Tihuana
 (2006) Um Dia de Cada Vez
 (2013) Agora é pra Valer!

Live albums 

 (2008) Tropa de Elite ao Vivo

Brazilian rock music groups
Musical groups established in 1999
1999 establishments in Brazil